1985 in Korea may refer to:
1985 in North Korea
1985 in South Korea